The Woman of the Iron Bracelets is a 1920 British silent crime film directed by Sidney Morgan and starring Eve Balfour, George Keene and Marguerite Blanche.

Plot
A fleeing young woman facing a murder charge, goes to the assistance of a young man who is being cheated out of his inheritance by his stepfather. The iron bracelets of the title refer to her handcuffs.

Cast
 Eve Balfour as Noah Berwell  
 George Keene as Harry St. John  
 Marguerite Blanche as Olive St. John  
 George Bellamy as Dr. Harvey 
 Arthur Walcott as Mr. Lawson 
 Alice De Winton as Mrs. Lawson

References

Bibliography
 Low, Rachael. The History of the British Film 1918-1929. George Allen & Unwin, 1971.

External links
 

1920 films
British crime drama films
British silent feature films
Films directed by Sidney Morgan
1920 crime drama films
Films based on British novels
British black-and-white films
1920s English-language films
1920s British films
Silent crime drama films